Richard Rhys O'Brien (born 19 November 1950, Banbury, Oxfordshire) is a British economist, futurist, author and co-founder of Outsights, a scenario planning consultancy. Since 2009 he has also been a singer songwriter. and biographer.

Early life 
After graduating from Oxford University (MA Hons. Philosophy, Politics and Economics) and Edinburgh University (Diploma in African Studies), O'Brien worked at Rothschild Intercontinental Bank and American Express Bank for 21 years. At American Express, he was Chief Economist and Executive Director and Editor of The Amex Bank Review where he did country risk analysis. O'Brien created the economics essay competition, The Amex Bank Review Awards, in memory of EU architect Robert Marjolin. He worked with the Group of Thirty (G30) on regulation and the World Bank. O'Brien worked on several books on the global economy, including "Global Financial Integration: the End of Geography".

Later career in future planning 
In 1998 O'Brien set up Outsights, a scenario planning consultancy, with Tim Bolderson who had worked with him at Global Business Network, where they completed large scale scenario planning projects such as The Future of Japan. O'Brien has led and developed scenarios for business and the UK Government in a wide range of sectors, including "The Future of the International Environment 2010-2020", and directing the Sigma Scan, an online database of future trends to 2050.

Music career 
Since 2009 he has published six albums of songs, under his full name Richard Rhys O'Brien.

Biographer career 
In 2019 he published an online study of the network of Lady Margaret Rhondda, the suffragette, businesswoman and publisher. In October 2022 Ylolfa published his biographical study of the political and other campaigns of Margaret Lloyd George, the wife of Prime Minister David Lloyd George.

Publications and songs
 "I know a little place", music album 2012
 "Anguneau sunset", music album 2014
  "Sense in our brains"  music album 2015
  "Don't Believe the Crystal Ball"  music album 2018
  "The Ballad of Highbury Barn"  music album 2019
  "Wherever the Moon Is, Songs of Migration"  music album 2019
  "The Campaigns of Margaret Lloyd George. The Wife of the Prime Minister 1916-1922. YLolfa 
  Drivers of change for the future of the UN in Post 2015-UN Development: Making change happen?? , Browne, Stephen and Weiss, Thomas G. (2014) Routledge 
 The Annual Register 300th Edition: a personal future, O'Brien, ProQuest, the 2009 Annual Register: World Events, 9-15, 2009.  
 The Geography of Finance: After the Storm, O'Brien, Keith, Oxford University Press, Cambridge Journal of Regions, Economy and Society, Volume 2, Issue 2, July 2009. ISSN 1752-1386
 The Future of the Global Economy, O'Brien, Keith, Prest, Outsights Ltd, 2009
 Corporate Governance, Financial Markets and Global Convergence, Balling, Hennessy, O'Brien, Springer (1997). 
 Risk Management in Volatile Financial Markets, Bruni, Fair, O'Brien, Allen, Springer (1996). 
 Finance and the International Economy 8. The Amex Bank Review Prize Essays, O'Brien (ed), Oxford University Press, 1994. 
 Global Financial Integration: The End of Geography, O'Brien, Council on Foreign Relations Press (1992). 
 Banking Perspectives on the Debt Crisis, Oxford Review of Economic Policy, 2: 25 - 38, 1986
 Private Bank Lending to Developing Countries: Past, Present and Future, O'Brien, World Bank Staff Working Paper No. 482, World Bank, Washington, DC, 1981

 Associations 
O'Brien serves and has served on a number of governing councils, and has chaired several international competitions:
 BBC World Challenge
 Shell/Economist Writing Prize
 The Annual Register
 Royal Institute of International Affairs
 Society of Business Economists
 Royal Economic Society
 Research Advisory Board, Economic and Social Science Research Council''
 Kingswood School, Bath

References

1950 births
Alumni of the University of Edinburgh
Alumni of the University of Oxford
British consultants
English non-fiction writers
Living people
People from Banbury
English male non-fiction writers